Lynette ("Lyn") Nixon, OAM is an Australian Paralympic tandem cycling pilot.  At the 2000 Sydney Games, she won a gold medal in the Women's Tandem open event, for which she received a Medal of the Order of Australia, a silver medal in the Women's 1 km Time Trial Tandem open event and a bronze medal in the Women's Individual Pursuit Open event, riding with Lyn Lepore.

References

Paralympic cyclists of Australia
Cyclists at the 2000 Summer Paralympics
Medalists at the 2000 Summer Paralympics
Paralympic sighted guides
Paralympic gold medalists for Australia
Paralympic silver medalists for Australia
Paralympic bronze medalists for Australia
Recipients of the Medal of the Order of Australia
Living people
Australian female cyclists
Year of birth missing (living people)
Paralympic medalists in cycling